"It's On" is a song by American hip hop trio Naughty by Nature, released on June 8, 1993 as the second single from their third album, 19 Naughty III (1993). The song was produced and written by the three members of the group, and found decent success on the US Billboard charts, making it to number 74 on the Billboard Hot 100 and number 48 on the Billboard Hot R&B/Hip-Hop Songs chart. It samples jazz artist Donald Byrd's "French Spice", for which he received writing credits. The official remix was produced by the production duo The Beatnuts and featured on the B-Side of the single.

Critical reception
In an retrospective review, Jesse Ducker from Albumism stated that the song "is a musical change of pace, as Treach and Vinnie rhyme over a horn-heavy loop from Donald Byrd's "French Spice"." Upon the single release, Larry Flick from Billboard described it as "another wildly infectious, fist-waving anthem that combines rapid-fire rhymes and live, butt-shaking beats." He added, "Chanted chorus could open deserved doors at top 40 formats, though track is hard enough to keep that all-important street cred in check." Andy Beevers from Music Week felt that "this hard-hitting rap track will appeal to established fans but appears to lack the crossover appeal of "OPP" or "Hip Hip Hooray"." Touré from Rolling Stone declared it as a "strong" single.

Single track listing
 A-Side
"It's On" (Kay Gee Remix) - 3:06  
"It's On" (Instrumental) - 3:06

 B-Side
"It's On" (Beatnuts Remix) - 3:31  
"Hip Hop Hooray" (Pete Rock Remix) - 4:32  
"It's On" (A Capella) - 3:11

Charts

References

1993 singles
Naughty by Nature songs
Tommy Boy Records singles
1992 songs
Songs written by Treach
Songs written by KayGee
Songs written by Vin Rock
Song recordings produced by Naughty by Nature
Jazz rap songs